Luo Qi may refer to:

Luo Qi (engineer) (born 1967), Chinese engineer
Luo Qi (singer) (born 1975), Chinese singer